Acacia ptychoclada is a shrub of the genus Acacia and the subgenus Plurinerves that is endemic to a small area of south eastern Australia.

Description
Like most species of Acacia it has phyllodes rather than true leaves. It blooms between January and April producing yellow flowers.

Distribution
It has a limited distribution within the Blue Mountains of New South Wales from around Woodford in the south to around Mount Victoria in the north. It is often situated in swampy areas and damp places along creeks over or around areas of sandstone.

See also
List of Acacia species

References

ptychoclada
Flora of New South Wales
Taxa named by Joseph Maiden
Taxa named by William Blakely
Plants described in 1927